1-Naphthyl isothiocyanate is a chemical compound which is an isothiocyanate derivative of naphthalene.

References 

Isothiocyanates
1-Naphthyl compounds